Stenotrophomonas bentonitica is a Gram-negative, rod-shaped and aerobic bacterium from the genus of Stenotrophomonas which has been isolated from soil from Almeria in Spain.

References

External links
Type strain of Stenotrophomonas bentonitica at BacDive -  the Bacterial Diversity Metadatabase

Xanthomonadales
Bacteria described in 2017